The buffalo is the second animal symbol in the 12-year cycle of the Vietnamese zodiac, taking the place of the Ox in the Chinese zodiac. Water buffalo are industrious and patient. In general, the year is slow and steady, appropriate for scientists. The hours of the buffalo are from 1 to 3 am.

See also 
Chinese zodiac
Burmese zodiac
Ox
Ox in Chinese mythology

References

Vietnamese astrological signs
Mythological bovines